Benedetta Cibrario (born 1962 in Florence) is an Italian writer. She was the recipient of the Rapallo Carige Prize for Sotto cieli noncuranti in 2010.

Works
 Rossovermiglio, (Feltrinelli, 2007)
 Sotto cieli noncuranti, (Feltrinelli, 2010)
  Lo Scurnuso, (Feltrinelli, 2011)

References

Italian women novelists
21st-century Italian women writers
21st-century Italian novelists
Writers from Florence
1962 births
Living people